The term act of nature may refer to:
 Natural disaster, generally
 A legal term used in certain contracts, synonymous with the legal term an act of God